Captain Rogelio Castillo National Airport  is an airport serving Celaya, a city in the state of Guanajuato in Mexico. It is located 15 minutes away from downtown, and is mainly used for general aviation purposes. It is operated by "Patronato del Aeropuerto de Celaya", a government-owned corporation.

The airport had a few flights to Ixtapa in November 2004 but the service was cancelled due to the very few people that bought tickets. Commercial flights began on January 22, 2007 with the route Celaya - Querétaro - Monterrey and Celaya - Querétaro - Mexico City, operated by the company Aeromar. The service ended on April 18, 2008 due to low demand and high fuel cost.

Facilities

References

External links
 

Airports in Guanajuato
Celaya